The Pretty Rhythm arcade games Takara Tomy feature a group of characters whose appearances can be customized with special outfits located in Prism Stones, which can be acquired through clearing stages in the game. The characters also appeared in anime and manga adaptations.

Overview

The first game, Pretty Rhythm: Mini Skirt was released on July 15, 2010. Rizumu Amamiya was the main player character, whereas Kanon Todo and Serena Jonouchi were unlockable characters once the player reaches Bronze and Gold rank respectively. The season 2 update, launched on October 14, 2010, featured a collaboration with girl group AKB48, with then-trainee members Miyu Takeuchi, Anna Mori, and Haruka Shimada releasing the song "Mini Skirt no Yōsei" under the group name Mini Skirt. For a limited time, Takeuchi, Mori, and Shimada were also playable in the game using their nicknames, Miyumiyu, Nan-chan, and Haruu.

During the season 4 update, the game was rebranded as Pretty Rhythm: Aurora Dream to coincide with the anime adaptation tie-in, and it was launched on April 28, 2011 with Aira Harune added as a playable character. Mion Takamine was added as a playable character during the season 7 update, "Pretty Remake Edition", on December 15, 2011.

During the season 9 update on April 26, 2012, the game was renamed Pretty Rhythm: Dear My Future and added Mia Ageha, Reina Miyama, Karin Shijimi, and Ayami Oruri, fictional versions of the girl group Prizmmy, as playable characters. Season 10, "Pretty Debut Edition", was launched on July 19, 2012, adding Hye-in, So-min, Shi-yoon, Chae-kyung, and Jae-eun, the fictionalized versions of the girl group of Puretty, as playable characters.

Pretty Rhythm: Rainbow Live was launched on April 18, 2013 as a new series and tie-in to the animated adaptation of the same name. The session 1 update was titled the "Prism Live Debut Edition" and added Naru Ayase, Ann Fukuhara, and Ito Suzuno as playable characters, along with Rinne. Rinne, a playable character first introduced in Pretty Rhythm: My Deco Rainbow Wedding, a Nintendo 3DS port of Pretty Rhythm: Mini Skirt, was also added as a playable character. The session 2 update, "All Rare! Ki-ra-me-ki Days Edition", was launched on July 11, 2013, and added Bell Renjoji, Otoha Takanashi, and Wakana Morizono as playable characters. June was added as a playable character beginning November 23, 2013 during the session 3 update, when the game was retitled Pretty Rhythm: Rainbow Live Duo. Cosmo Hojo was introduced as a new playable character in the Nintendo 3DS game Pretty Rhythm: Rainbow Live: Kirakira My Design.

An expanded version of Kirakira My Design was released for the Nintendo 3DS on January 5, 2015, under the title PriPara & Pretty Rhythm: PriPara de Tsukaeru Oshare Item 1450!, as a crossover with the Pretty Rhythm and PriPara games. PriPara character Laala Manaka and Hiro Hayami were added as playable characters.

Playable characters

{| class="wikitable plainrowheaders sortable"
|-
! scope="col" | Character
! scope="col" style="width: 5em;"| Mini Skirt{{efn|name=a|Mini Skirt, Aurora Dream, and Dear My Future'''s updates are counted as "seasons" and are cumulative. Seasons 1-3 take place in Mini Skirt, Seasons 4-8 take place in Aurora Dream, and Seasons 9-11 take place in Dear My Future.}} (2010-2011)
! scope="col" style="width: 5em;"| Aurora Dream (2011-2012)
! scope="col" style="width: 5em;"| Dear My Future (2012-2013)
! scope="col" style="width: 5em;"| My Deco Rainbow Wedding (2013)
! scope="col" style="width: 5em;"| Rainbow Live{{efn|name=d|Rainbow Live and Rainbow Live Duo's updates are counted as "sessions" and are cumulative. Sessions 1-2 take place in Rainbow Live and Session 3-4 takes place in Rainbow Live Duo.}} (2013-2014)
! scope="col" style="width: 5em;"| Rainbow Live Duo (2013-2014)
! scope="col" style="width: 5em;"| Rainbow Live: Kirakira My Design (2013)
! scope="col" style="width: 5em;"| All Star Legend Coord Edition (2014)
! scope="col" style="width: 5em;"| PriPara de Tsukaeru Oshare Item 1450! (2015)
|- style="text-align:center;"
! scope="row"| Rizumu Amamiya
| 
| 
| 
| 
| 
| 
| 
| 
| 
|- style="text-align:center;"
! scope="row"| Kanon Tōdō
| 
| 
| 
| 
| 
| 
| 
| 
| 
|- style="text-align:center;"
! scope="row"| Serena Jōnouchi
| 
| 
| 
| 
| 
| 
| 
| 
| 
|- style="text-align:center;"
! scope="row"| Haruu
| 
| 
| 
| 
| 
| 
| 
| 
| 
|- style="text-align:center;"
! scope="row"| Miyumiyu
| 
| 
| 
| 
| 
| 
| 
| 
| 
|- style="text-align:center;"
! scope="row"| Nan-chan
| 
| 
| 
| 
| 
| 
| 
| 
| 
|- style="text-align:center;"
! scope="row"| Aira Harune
| 
| 
| 
| 
| 
| 
| 
| 
| 
|- style="text-align:center;"
! scope="row"| Mion Takamine
| 
| 
| 
| 
| 
| 
| 
| 
| 
|- style="text-align:center;"
! scope="row"| Kaname Chris
| 
| 
| 
| 
| 
| 
| 
| 
| 
|- style="text-align:center;"
! scope="row"| Mia Ageha
| 
| 
| 
| 
| 
| 
| 
| 
| 
|- style="text-align:center;"
! scope="row"| Reina Miyama
| 
| 
| 
| 
| 
| 
| 
| 
| 
|- style="text-align:center;"
! scope="row"| Karin Shijimi
| 
| 
| 
| 
| 
| 
| 
| 
| 
|- style="text-align:center;"
! scope="row"| Ayami Oruri
| 
| 
| 
| 
| 
| 
| 
| 
| 
|- style="text-align:center;"
! scope="row"| Hye-in
| 
| 
| 
| 
| 
| 
| 
| 
| 
|- style="text-align:center;"
! scope="row"| So-min
| 
| 
| 
| 
| 
| 
| 
| 
| 
|- style="text-align:center;"
! scope="row"| Shi-yoon
| 
| 
| 
| 
| 
| 
| 
| 
| 
|- style="text-align:center;"
! scope="row"| Chae-kyung
| 
| 
| 
| 
| 
| 
| 
| 
| 
|- style="text-align:center;"
! scope="row"| Jae-eun
| 
| 
| 
| 
| 
| 
| 
| 
| 
|- style="text-align:center;"
! scope="row"| Rinne
| 
| 
| 
| 
| 
| 
| 
| 
| 
|- style="text-align:center;"
! scope="row"| Naru Ayase
| 
| 
| 
| 
| 
| 
| 
| 
| 
|- style="text-align:center;"
! scope="row"| Ann Fukuhara
| 
| 
| 
| 
| 
| 
| 
| 
| 
|- style="text-align:center;"
! scope="row"| Ito Suzuno
| 
| 
| 
| 
| 
| 
| 
| 
| 
|- style="text-align:center;"
! scope="row"| Bell Renjoji
| 
| 
| 
| 
| 
| 
| 
| 
| 
|- style="text-align:center;"
! scope="row"| Otoha Takanashi
| 
| 
| 
| 
| 
| 
| 
| 
| 
|- style="text-align:center;"
! scope="row"| Wakana Morizono
| 
| 
| 
| 
| 
| 
| 
| 
| 
|- style="text-align:center;"
! scope="row"| June Amou
| 
| 
| 
| 
| 
| 
| 
| 
| 
|- style="text-align:center;"
! scope="row"| Cosmo Hojo
| 
| 
| 
| 
| 
| 
| 
| 
| 
|- style="text-align:center;"
! scope="row"| Laala Manaka
| 
| 
| 
| 
| 
| 
| 
| 
| 
|- style="text-align:center;"
! scope="row"| Hiro Hayami
| 
| 
| 
| 
| 
| 
| 
| 
| 
|- style="text-align:center;"
|}

Other characters

The series' guide is named , who is in charge of helping the player dress up and provide information about clothing. Hibiki and Wataru, members of the group Callings, appear as non-playable characters during the story mode in Pretty Rhythm: Mini Skirt''.

Notes

References

Pretty Rhythm
Pretty Rhythm